Hydrophyllum occidentale is a species of flowering plant in the waterleaf family known by the common name  western waterleaf.

Distribution
It is native to the western United States from California to Idaho, where it grows in a variety of habitats from wet mountain meadows to dry chaparral slopes.

Description
This is a rhizomatous perennial herb producing a patch of leaves, most of which are made up of many pairs of oval-shaped, bluntly lobed green leaflets. These compound leaves may be up to 40 centimeters long. The plant produces erect stems branching into green to reddish-purple rough-haired, leafless peduncles bearing inflorescences.

The inflorescence is a large ball of densely packed flowers. Each flower is up to a centimeter wide and bright white to lavender. It is coated in downy white hairs and has a long protruding style and usually five stamens with large purple or red anthers. The fruit is a spherical capsule containing two seeds. The inflorescence of Hydrophyllum occidentale occurs above the leaf canopy.

External links
Jepson Manual Treatment
Photo gallery

occidentale
Flora of the Sierra Nevada (United States)
Flora of California
Flora of the West Coast of the United States
Flora of the Northwestern United States
Flora of the Western United States
Flora without expected TNC conservation status